Nemanthus nitidus is a species of sea anemone within the family Nemanthidae. The species is found in the western Pacific near areas such as Korea, Japan, New Caledonia and the Philippines at depths of 30 to 70 meters. It grows to lengths of 2 to 3 centimeters.

References 

Animals described in 1908
Nemanthidae
Fauna of the Pacific Ocean